The Córas Iompair Éireann 121 Class was a railway locomotive which was manufactured by General Motors Electro-Motive Division. These locomotives were in regular service on the Irish railway network until 2002, with the last two remaining in service until 2008.

History 
The poor availability of the A and C class locomotives in the late 1950s together with the split of the cross-border Great Northern Railway in 1958 and the target to eliminate Steam Locomotives led CIÉ to urgently seek more diesel locomotives, turning to an American-style single cab road switcher design from General Motors. The 121 Class were manufactured from December 1960 to January 1961 and numbered B121 to B135 inclusive. The locomotives proved an immediate success, with low maintenance and high availability, and led to further orders from the same supplier starting with the 141 class.

From the early 1970s onwards several locomotives of this class dropped the "B" prefix from their fleet number when re-liveried. The last two locomotives that survived in traffic (124 and B134) were both withdrawn from service on 3 May 2008. Prior to 1961, almost all Irish diesel locomotives were built in Great Britain, but from the 1960s onwards, GM became the sole supplier of locomotives to CIÉ, which eventually also extended to Northern Ireland Railways locomotives at a later stage. These were EMD's first ever fully American-built locomotives delivered to Europe. The layout of the cab was quite different from the other conventional CIÉ diesel models of the time, with the controls to the side of the driver, rather than the front. Due to apparent driver complaints of reduced visibility when operating with cab trailing, it was ultimately decided that these locomotives should only operate in a cab-leading formation. Later conversion for multiple-unit working allowed two 121 class locomotives to be coupled hood-end to hood-end, removing the need to turn them around for their return journey.

The engine blocks were originally recycled from withdrawn rebuilt class B201s, but in their later years much swapping of engines occurred between classes 121, 141 and 181.

All but three (B121, B125, and B135) were fitted with Train Door Control equipment for operation with the Inchicore-built, British Rail Mark 3 based, push-pull train units. The push-pull equipment of locomotive B132 was subsequently decommissioned. Entering service in 1989, these trains, consisting of a single 121 Class and up to six carriages, were mainly used on the Dublin northern suburban passenger railway service. These were to be the last regular passenger duties for the 121s within Greater Dublin. The Limerick shuttle continued to be worked by 121s for several years after this date. In 1994, a railcar revolution had begun, and the push pull carriages were later re-deployed to inter-city duties with the 201 Class locomotives.

Withdrawal
 
The first member of the class to be withdrawn was 125 in 1986 following an electrical fire, though it had been extensively damaged in an accident twelve years previously. However it was not scrapped until 2002.

By 1995, the 201 class had replaced the 121 class on most passenger routes. Throughout the late 1990s the fleet dwindled, and by 2005 only numbers 124 and B134 remained in service, with number 123 in storage for five years until eventually being scrapped in 2008. The rest of the fleet was also scrapped, due to the decline in freight traffic that they were also used for.

Their last official scheduled mainline passenger working was on 9 July 2005 on the Sligo line. The last known passenger working of this class was the 13:15 Waterford-Heuston service on 18 January 2007. Previously, these locomotives had filled in on the Manulla-Ballina service or the occasional service from Limerick.

The last use of them in public service was in the early months of 2008 on maintenance trains. By this stage 124 and 134 were the only survivors. Both were retired by degrees and officially withdrawn in July 2008, though at this stage neither had done much for many weeks.

Preservation

The Irish Traction Group has preserved locomotive 124. It is located at Moyasta Junction on the preserved West Clare Railway.

The other surviving member of the class, locomotive B134, is owned by the Railway Preservation Society of Ireland (RPSI), and is undergoing restoration. On 19 July 2016 it was hauled by 071 Class locomotive 071 from Inchicore to the RPSI's locomotive shed at Dublin Connolly. Later that year it was returned to Inchicore. In 2021 it was given a protective top-coat in older IE grey (per 071 class) with plans for final fitments, mainline testing, and an RPSI railtour in that livery at some point in 2022 with plans to repaint to original silver-grey livery at a later point.

The cab of locomotive 133 is preserved at the Cavan & Leitrim Railway in Dromod, County Leitrim.

Livery
On delivery, the locomotives were painted in a yellow and grey livery. This was replaced within a year by a black / tan (“golden brown”) colour scheme with a thick white band similar to the Cravens coaching stock, delivered in 1963. With time, the colour scheme changed to tan with a black band. Soon after CIÉ Rail services became known as Irish Rail, the colour scheme was enhanced when two white bands (approx. 25 mm / 1") separating the colours were added. At the same time, as a safety aspect, self-adhesive high-visibility panels were added to the front of the Locomotives.

Model
The 121 Class has been made as a 00 gauge Whitemetal kit by Model Irish Railways.

3D printed bodyshells are available through Shapeways. The 2mm and 3mm versions are by Valve Design, the 4mm one by Rail 3D Prints.

Murphy Models released an '00' gauge ready to run model of the 121 class in the 4th quarter of 2020. There are 13 variants covering the periods of CIE, IR and IE plus the RPSI model.

References

External links 

 Eiretrains - Irish Locomotives
 preserved loco 124
 RPSI owned 134

See also
Diesel locomotives of Ireland

Bo-Bo locomotives
Electro-Motive Division locomotives
Iarnród Éireann locomotives
5 ft 3 in gauge locomotives
Railway locomotives introduced in 1961
Diesel-electric locomotives of Ireland